Yakutiye Madrasa is a historical 14th-century Madrasa in Erzurum, Turkey. The madrasa was built in 1310 by order of a local governor of the Ilkhanids, Hoca Yakut, and it is named after him.

Building
It is a rectangular building with an inner courtyard, surrounded by the rooms for the students. It has a monumental portal decorated with stone carvings and one Minaret with geometrical decorations. There is also an adjoining Kümbet.
Today the building is used as a museum dedicated to ethnography and Turkish and Islamic art.

Sources

Buildings and structures completed in 1310
Buildings and structures in Erzurum
Seljuk architecture
Madrasas in Turkey
World Heritage Tentative List for Turkey